The 1600SW is a widescreen flat panel video monitor from Silicon Graphics introduced in 1998.  It won many awards after release and sold 54,000 units.  It is notable for longevity, with used models still actively traded on eBay a decade later, though difficult to adapt the OpenLDI video interface to modern video cards.

The 1600SW was advanced for its time, featuring a 17.3 inch diagonal wide screen panel in a market then dominated by CRT monitors. The 1600SW has a 25:16 aspect ratio (referred to by SGI as SuperWide) with a resolution of 1600 x 1024 pixels. The refresh rate is 60 Hz in 24-bit color and 110 dpi, which makes a smaller dot pitch than most competitive monitors. The 1600SW shared the same styling motif as the SGI Visual Workstation 320, 540, and O2, with a unique off-center mount. The display won several international awards and compares well to modern displays produced a decade later.

Formac sold the same monitor bundled with its own OpenLDI graphics adapter as Formac ProNitron 18/500 Radius sold the monitor as the Artica  which differs mainly in a translucent white case and a conventional mount.  SGI sold the monitor primarily as Model #AM173Y01.

See also

FPD-Link
OpenLDI
SGI 320
SGI O2

References

External links
 SGI: Legacy Products: Displays an archive of original material (P/N AM173Y01).
 1600SW MDR36 connector pinout

Silicon Graphics
Computer monitors